Gerardo Olivares (born 1964) is a Spanish filmmaker and screenwriter. He is married with two children and lives in Madrid. He was the first Spanish man to win the Golden Spike at the prestigious Seminci film festival in Valladolid for his film "14 kilómetros". He received the 2019 Cinema for Peace Award for Justice for his film 'Two Catalonias.'

Travels

A tireless traveler, Olivares began to travel the world in 1987 while studying Information Science at the Complutense University of Madrid. 
At the age of twenty he borrowed a Vespa motorcycle from his brother and for four months traveled in the North Cape in Lapland, where he did his first reportage on the nomads who live beyond the Arctic Circle. Back in Madrid, the report was published in Los Aventureros (The Adventurer).
Months later he started working under the direction of the journalist and writer Enrique Meneses, whom he has always considered his master.

A year later Olivares covered a good part of the Sahara with a Seat Panda, a desert he later crossed on multiple occasions. 
During this trip he began to mature what would be his first major documentary project, La Ruta de las Córdobas (The Cordobas Route), a trip from Alaska to Tierra del Fuego, following the 36 cities, towns and geographical features with the name of Cordoba. 
For a year and a half he traveled along the spine of the Americas in three all-terrain vehicles, and the result was a series of 8 episodes issued in 1992 by TVE with great ratings success.

Two years later, in 1994, Olivares encircled the continent of Africa by land, from Morocco to South Africa and then to Egypt, as Director of Ruta de los Exploradores (Path of the Explorers), co-produced by TVE. 
In 1997 he traveled across the Asian continent from Spain to Singapore in two trucks for the series Road to Samarkand, the most watched program of 2000 in TVE 2, winning the GECA award for a record audience.

Fiction

In 2005, after a long career directing and writing documentaries, Olivares decided to jump into fiction with the help of producer Jose Maria Morales (Wanda Films) with La Gran final (The Great Match), shot in Mongolia, the Sahara and Brazilian Amazon. 
This film won several international awards and was selected to participate, among others, in the Berlin International Film Festival. 
The film was an official selection at the Copenhagen International Film Festival, the Galway Film Fleadh, the World Cinema Festival, Cap Ttown and the Desert Nights Filmfest, Rome.
It was nominated for Best Film at the Malaga Spanish Film Festival.

In 2006 he wrote and directed 14 kilómetros, a film about the plight of African immigration that has won over 15 international awards, affirming him as one of the most committed filmmakers in the panorama of Spanish cinema.
His 2010 feature film, Entrelobos (Among wolves), based on the remarkable story of Marcos Rodríguez Pantoja, has been one of the highest grossing Spanish films of 2010 with more than half a million viewers in theaters.  It tells the true story of a young shepherd in a remote mountain area who befriends a pack of wolves and eventually becomes their leader.

Filmography
A partial list of films:

References

Living people
1964 births
21st-century Spanish screenwriters
Spanish male screenwriters
Spanish film directors